Antarcticite is an uncommon calcium chloride hexahydrate mineral with formula CaCl2·6H2O. It forms colorless acicular trigonal crystals. It is hygroscopic and has a low specific gravity of 1.715.

As its name implies, it was first described in 1965 for an occurrence in Antarctica where it occurs as crystalline precipitate from a highly saline brine in Don Juan Pond, in the west end of Wright Valley, Victoria Land. This discovery was made by Japanese geochemists Tetsuya Torii and Joyo Ossaka. It was also reported from brine in Bristol Dry Lake, California, and stratified brine within blue holes on North Andros Island in the Bahamas. It has also been noted within fluid inclusions within quartz in pegmatite bodies in the Bushveld complex of South Africa. It occurs in association with halite, gypsum and celestine in the California dry lake.

A similar mineral, sinjarite, the dihydrate of calcium chloride, crystallizes in the tetragonal system. Sinjarite is semitransparent, with pale pink color. Hydrophilite is a now discredited calcium chloride mineral that is considered to be either antarcticite or sinjarite.

See also
 Geology of Sinjar Mountains, for sinjarite

References

Halide minerals
Trigonal minerals
Minerals in space group 150